Alton Lennon Federal Building and Courthouse, also known as the Customs House, is a historic Federal building and courthouse  located at Wilmington, New Hanover County, North Carolina. It was designed by the Office of the Supervising Architect under James A. Wetmore and built between 1916 and 1919.  It is an imposing three-story, Classical Revival style light sandstone building.  It consists of a central mass with balanced projecting wings having engaged pedimented porticos. The design of the front facade of the earlier 1840s customs house is incorporated into the projecting wings to the cast iron details. The building measures 332 feet by 113 feet.  The building was named for U.S. Congressman and Senator Alton Lennon (1906-1986) in 1976. It was used as the outside of the courthouse on seasons 7-9 of Andy Griffith's TV series Matlock on ABC.

It was listed on the National Register of Historic Places in 1974. It is located in the Wilmington Historic District.

References

Federal buildings in the United States
Courthouses on the National Register of Historic Places in North Carolina
Government buildings on the National Register of Historic Places in North Carolina
Neoclassical architecture in North Carolina
Government buildings completed in 1919
Buildings and structures in Wilmington, North Carolina
National Register of Historic Places in New Hanover County, North Carolina
Individually listed contributing properties to historic districts on the National Register in North Carolina